The Women's 5000 metres event at the 2013 European Athletics U23 Championships was held in Tampere, Finland, at Ratina Stadium on 14 July.

Medalists

Results

Final
14 July 2013 

Intermediate times:
1000m: 3:11.49 Layes Abdullayeva 
2000m: 6:17.35 Gamze Bulut 
3000m: 9:17.79 Gamze Bulut 
4000m: 12:33.29 Gamze Bulut

Participation
According to an unofficial count, 23 athletes from 15 countries participated in the event.

References

5000 metres
5000 metres at the European Athletics U23 Championships